Strong in the Sun is the third studio album by Irish band Tír na nÓg. It was released on 26 October 1973 in the United Kingdom and in January 1974 in the United States.

Track listings

Personnel
Sonny Condell - vocals, acoustic guitar, electric guitar, pottery drums, jaw harp
Leo O'Kelly - vocals, acoustic guitar, electric lead guitar, dulcimer, violin
Matthew Fisher - keyboards, production
Geoff Emerick - engineering

Additional personnel
Brian Odgers, Dave Markee, Jim Ryan - bass
Barry De Souza, Ace Follington, Jeff Jones - drums

Album single
"Strong in the Sun"
Released: 7 September 1973 (UK)

Release history

References

1973 albums
Chrysalis Records albums
Tír na nÓg (band) albums